In Torment in Hell is the sixth studio album by American death metal band Deicide. It was released on September 25, 2001, on Roadrunner Records.

Reception

The album received strong criticism from the metal underground for what many critics view as rushed production and lackluster songwriting. The label pressured the band for a quick follow-up to Insineratehymn, but Deicide failed to meet the deadline of its original release date of July 31. The band rarely plays any songs from this album live.

Reflecting on the album in 2006, drummer Steve Asheim conceded that the album's weaknesses were not solely attributable to record label difficulties:

Track listing

Personnel
Glen Benton – bass, vocals
Eric Hoffman – guitars
Brian Hoffman – guitars
Steve Asheim – drums
Deicide – production, mixing

Charts

Monthly

References

2001 albums
Deicide (band) albums
Roadrunner Records albums
Albums recorded at Morrisound Recording